Robert D. Joffe (May 26, 1943 – January 28, 2010) was an American lawyer. One of the leading corporate lawyers in the United States, Joffe was a partner at prominent New York law firm Cravath, Swaine & Moore from 1975 until his death, and he was the firm's presiding partner from 1999 to 2006.

In 1989, Joffe successfully defended Time Inc. against a hostile bid by Paramount Communications. He handled Time Warner's purchase of Turner Broadcasting System in 1996 as well as the merger with AOL in 2001. In 2008, he represented Bank of America in the acquisition of Merrill Lynch.

He died on January 28, 2010, from pancreatic cancer, aged 66.

References

External links
Forbes.com: Leading corporate lawyers, 2001
Robert D. Joffe 1/29/2010 obituary news in Harvard Law School News, "Robert D. Joffe ’67 (1943 – 2010)"
Robert D. Joffe 2/1/2010 obituary article from the Harvard Crimson, "Robert D. Joffe ’64, Former Cravath Head and Corporate Legal Adviser, Dies at 66"

1943 births
2010 deaths
Lawyers from New York City
Harvard Law School alumni
Deaths from cancer in New York (state)
Deaths from pancreatic cancer
20th-century American Jews
Cravath, Swaine & Moore partners
20th-century American lawyers
21st-century American Jews